Bettenauer Weiher (or Bettenauerweier, coll. "Betti") is a reservoir between Jonschwil and Oberuzwil in the Canton of St. Gallen, Switzerland. The reservoir formed in the 15th century when a dam was built for a fish pond. Today, fishing in the lake is only allowed for retired persons of the local industrial enterprise Bühler AG, to which it belongs.

The lake is an amphibian spawning area of national importance in Switzerland.

External links
 
 More information about the Bettenauer Weiher at schweizersee.ch

Reservoirs in Switzerland
Lakes of the canton of St. Gallen